Bounce It is a hip hop song by American rapper Juicy J, released on June 25, 2013 as the fourth official single from his third solo studio album Stay Trippy (2013). The song features guest appearances from fellow artists Wale and Trey Songz. The song has since peaked at number 74 on the Billboard Hot 100.

Music video
The music video (directed by Benny Boom) was filmed on July 2, 2013. On July 18, 2013, the music video premiered on BET's 106 & Park. Fellow rapper Wiz Khalifa makes a cameo appearance in the video.

Remix
The official remix features a verse by Wiz Khalifa and new verses by both Juicy J and Trey Songz & additional instrumentation to the song. It was released on November 20, 2013 on Juicy J's SoundCloud account. This remix has another version replacing the instrumental with a new rhythmic club beat dubbed the "Remix 2.0", which was released on the same day.

The remix originally feature a verse by Big Sean before being replaced by Wiz Khalifa's verse. This version was released on October 29, 2013 on Dr. Luke's SoundCloud account.

Chart performance
Bounce It spent 19 weeks on the Billboard Hot 100, peaking at number 74. It also spent 14 weeks on Rhythmic radio, peaking at number 22.

Weekly charts

Year-end charts

Certifications

Radio and release history

References

2013 singles
2013 songs
Juicy J songs
Trey Songz songs
Wale (rapper) songs
Columbia Records singles
Songs written by Juicy J
Songs written by Wale (rapper)
Song recordings produced by Dr. Luke
Song recordings produced by Cirkut (record producer)
Songs written by Dr. Luke
Songs written by Cirkut (record producer)
Songs written by Jacob Kasher